The Caletes or Caleti (Gaulish: Caletoi "the hard [stubborn, tough] ones";  or Calētī) were a Belgic or Gallic tribe dwelling in Pays de Caux, in present-day Normandy, during the Iron Age and the Roman period.

Name 
They are mentioned as Caletes (var. Caletos, Cadetes) by Caesar (mid-1st c. BC), as Káletoi (Κάλετοι) and Kalétous (Καλέτους) by Strabo (early 1st c. AD), as Galetos (var. Galletos) by Pliny (1st c. AD), as Kalē̃tai (Καλη̃ται) by Ptolemy (2nd c. AD), and as Caleti by Orosius (early 5th c. AD).

The Gaulish ethnonym Caletoi literally means 'the hard ones', that is to say 'the stubborn' or 'the tough'. It derives from the Proto-Celtic stem *kaleto- ('hard, cruel, strong'; cf. Old Irish calath 'heroic', Middle Welsh caled 'hard'), itself from Proto-Indo-European *ḱelto-, meaning 'cold' (cf. Avest. sarǝta- 'cold', OEng.  'hero', Lat.  'to be hardened [by the experience], insensible').

The Pays de Caux, attested in 843 as Pago Calcis (Kaleto in 1206), is named after the Gallic tribe.

Geography 
The territory of the Calates closely corresponded to the Pays de Caux. They dwelled north of the neighbouring Veliocasses, and were separated from the Ambiani in the northeast by a minor tribe, the Catoslugi.

They occupied a section of the coast, between the Sequana and the Phrudis rivers. Harfleur (Caracotinum) was their principal port.

Culture 
Whether the Catales should be regarded as Gallic or Belgic is debatable. Caesar appears to attribute them to Belgica, their coins were of Belgic type, and they joined the Belgic opposition to Rome 57 BC. But, elsewhere, Caesar lists them along Armorican peoples, and they were not, unless briefly, part of the province of Gallia Belgica under the Roman Empire.

References

Bibliography

External links 

 Map of Northern Gaul showing the position of the Caletes.

 
Historical Celtic peoples
Gauls
Tribes of pre-Roman Gaul
Belgae